Twenty Love Poems and a Song of Despair is a collection of romantic poems by the Chilean poet Pablo Neruda, first published in 1924 by Editorial Nascimento of Santiago, when Neruda was 19. It was Neruda's second published work, after Crepusculario (Editorial Nascimento, 1923) and made his name as a poet.

Veinte poemas was controversial for its eroticism, especially considering its author's very young age.  Over the decades, Veinte poemas has  become Neruda's best-known work, and has sold more than 20 million copies. The book has been translated into many languages; in English, the translation was made by poet W. S. Merwin in 1969.

It remains the best selling poetry book in the Spanish language ever, almost 100 years after its first publication. As of 2020, it is in the public domain in the United States.

In 2001, the alternative rock musician Lynda Thomas released as a single the flamenco song "Ay, Ay, Ay", which was based on this work.

This poetry book is also the subject of Pablo Larraín’s acclaimed feature film Neruda starring Gael García Bernal.

See also
 Cape Editions

References

1924 poetry books
Chilean poetry collections
Pablo Neruda